Plectothripa is a monotypic moth genus of the family Nolidae. Its only species, Plectothripa excisa, is found in Peninsular Malaysia, Singapore, Sumatra, Borneo and Sulawesi. Both the genus and species were first described by George Hampson in 1818.

References

Chloephorinae
Monotypic moth genera